Jordão, (English: Jordan) is a municipality located in the western region of the Brazilian state of Acre. Its population is 8,473  and its area is 5,429 km².

The municipality contains 62% of the Alto Tarauacá Extractive Reserve, created in 2000.

References

Municipalities in Acre (state)
Road-inaccessible communities of Brazil